Natzler is a surname. Notable people with the surname include:

 Gertrud Natzler (1908–1971), Austrian-American ceramicist
 Grete Natzler (1906–1999), Austrian actress and operatic soprano
 Hertha Natzler (1911–1985), Austrian actress
 Otto Natzler (1908–2007), Austrian–born ceramicist